Royal Troon Golf Club is a links golf course in Scotland, located in Troon, South Ayrshire, southwest of Glasgow.

Founding and early years
The club, which now has a total of 45 holes, was founded in 1878, initially with five holes. It lies adjacent to the Firth of Clyde. George Strath was appointed in 1881 as the club's first golf professional, and together with 1882 Open champion Willie Fernie, designed the original course, expanding it to 18 holes by 1888. The two were assisted by Charlie Hunter, greenskeeper of the neighbouring Prestwick Golf Club, in Troon's formative years.

When Strath left the Club's employ in 1887, Fernie became head professional, and served in that role until his death in 1924. He laid out the club's original Portland Course as well; this course was named in honour of the 6th Duke of Portland, an essential early Troon Golf Club patron and facilitator, who was one of the region's largest landowners.

The Club's property lies between the Firth of Clyde on the west, a caravan park on the south (slightly further south lies Prestwick Golf Club), the railway line and main road on the east, and the town of Troon on the north. Glasgow Prestwick Airport is located slightly to the south and east of the club, and low-flying aircraft are nearest its southern section.

Redesigned for first Open Championship
Just prior to Royal Troon hosting its first Open Championship in 1923, the Old Course was redesigned, lengthened, and strengthened by James Braid, a five-time Open champion, one of the era's top architects, and a member of the World Golf Hall of Fame. Other than having new back tees on several holes, the current Old Course is essentially very similar to Braid's finished work.

Awarded 'Royal' designation
Troon was granted its "Royal" designation in 1978, during its centenary. Its clubhouse, designed by Henry Edward Clifford and built in 1886, is richly decorated with historical golf artifacts. James Montgomerie, father of Colin Montgomerie, served as Secretary in the 1980s.

Ten-time host of The Open Championship
Its Old Course is one of the host courses for The Open Championship, one of the major championships on the PGA Tour and European Tour. The Club most recently hosted in 2016 and will host the 2024 for a tenth time.

Past Open champions
Past Open champions at Royal Troon include Justin Leonard, Mark Calcavecchia, Tom Watson, Tom Weiskopf, Arnold Palmer, Bobby Locke, and Arthur Havers. Six consecutive Opens at Troon were won by Americans, from 1962 through 2004, ended by Henrik Stenson of Sweden in 2016.

Noteworthy characteristics

Seaside opening
The Old Course begins alongside the sea, running southwards in a line for the first six holes. This opening section offers full visibility and plenty of space, but does still require accuracy to avoid deep bunkers. Many good rounds have been fashioned through low scores here, often aided by prevailing downwind conditions.

Rise in complexity
Beginning with the seventh, the Old Course turns further inland, while simultaneously changing direction, on each of its next six holes, among hillier dunes and thicker vegetation, including gorse and whins, to severely punish offline shots. This sector, with two blind tee shots on the tenth and 11th, marks a sharp rise in difficulty from the opening holes.

Long finish
With the 13th hole, the player turns northwards for a long, very stern finish, running parallel to the opening stretch. This comprises three long par 4s, two tough par 3s, and a challenging par 5 (the 16th) with its fairway bisected at the halfway point by a ditch, which can only very rarely be carried from the tee. The player very often has to face a strong prevailing wind.

Famous holes
Royal Troon is home to both the longest and shortest holes in Open Championship golf. Regarded as one of the top holes in the world, the par-3 8th hole ("Postage Stamp") measures a scant , but its diminutive green measures a mere . Two holes earlier, the par-5 6th ("Turnberry") extends to a lengthy .

The 11th hole ("The Railway") is one of the most difficult holes in major championship golf. Now a long par-4, a blind tee shot has a long carry over gorse with out of bounds all along the railway on the right. The lengthy approach shot is to a small green that falls away, with nearby out of bounds.

Votes to admit women as members
On 1 July 2016, Royal Troon members voted overwhelmingly to admit women into the club as members, avoiding a potential controversy that could have overshadowed the 2016 Open Championship and the club being removed from the Open rota.

The Portland and Craigend Courses
The Old Course is the championship layout at Royal Troon. Its second course, the Portland, also an 18-hole layout from 1895, but significantly shorter than the Old Course, was redesigned in 1921 by golf course architect Dr. Alister MacKenzie, a member of the World Golf Hall of Fame. The Portland is also of very high standard. It is located slightly further inland and further north than the Old Course, with no holes bordering the Firth of Clyde; it has its own clubhouse.

The Craigend Course is a nine-hole par-3 course.

The Club is private; guests are allowed at certain times, under advance booking, with a handicap certificate establishing proficiency.

The Old Course has four tees – "Ladies", "Short", "Medal" and "Championship".

Layout
For 2020 Women's British Open:

Lengths of the course for previous Opens (since 1950):

 2016:  , par 71
 2004: , par 71
 1997: , par 71
 1989: , par 72
 1982: , par 72

 1973: , par 72   
 1962: , par 72
 1950: , par 70 

Opens from 1962 through 1989 played the 11th hole as a par-5.

The Open Championship
The Open Championship has been held at Troon on nine occasions:

 Note: For multiple winners of The Open Championship, superscript ordinal identifies which in their respective careers.
The Club will host The Open Championship again from 14–21 July 2024.

Women's British Open
The Women's British Open has been held at Troon once:

Hosts further significant events
Royal Troon has hosted the Amateur Championship on five occasions: 1956, 1968, 1978, 2003, and 2012.
The Club has hosted the British Ladies Amateur Golf Championship on four occasions: 1904, 1925, 1952, and 1984.
The Club has hosted the Senior Open Championship in 2008, and American Bruce Vaughan won.
The Club has hosted the Scottish Amateur on six occasions: 1923, 1956, 1963, 1969, 1977 and 2009.
The Club has hosted the Scottish Ladies' Amateur on five occasions: 1907, 1949, 1957, 1963, and 1982.

See also
List of golf clubs granted Royal status

References

External links

 The Open Championship – official site

Sports venues completed in 1878
1878 establishments in Scotland
Sports venues in South Ayrshire
Golf clubs and courses in South Ayrshire
The Open Championship venues
Organisations based in Scotland with royal patronage
Organisations based in South Ayrshire
Royal golf clubs